The Shoes on the Danube Bank is a memorial erected on 16 April 2005, in Budapest, Hungary. Conceived by film director Can Togay, he created it on the east bank of the Danube River with sculptor  to honour the Jews who were massacred by fascist Hungarian militia belonging to the Arrow Cross Party in Budapest during the Second World War.  They were ordered to take off their shoes (shoes were valuable and could be stolen and resold by the militia after the massacre), and were shot at the edge of the water so that their bodies fell into the river and were carried away. The memorial represents their shoes left behind on the bank.

Memorial

"The composition titled 'Shoes on the Danube Bank' gives remembrance to the 3,500 people, 800 of them Jews, who were shot into the Danube during the time of the Arrow Cross terror.  The sculptor created sixty pairs of period-appropriate shoes out of iron.  The shoes are attached to the stone embankment, and behind them lies a 40 meter long, 70 cm high stone bench.  At three points are cast iron signs, with the following text in Hungarian, English, and Hebrew: "To the memory of the victims shot into the Danube by Arrow Cross militiamen in 1944–45.  Erected 16 April 2005."

History
Most of the murders along the edge of the River Danube took place around December 1944 and January 1945, when the members of the Hungarian Arrow Cross Party police ("Nyilas") took as many as 20,000 Jews from the newly established Budapest ghetto and executed them along the river bank. Tommy Dick describes one surviving person's story from these operations in his book Getting Out Alive and testimony.
In February 1945, the Soviet forces liberated Budapest.

During World War II, Valdemar Langlet, head of the Swedish Red Cross in Budapest, with his wife Nina, and later the diplomat Raoul Wallenberg and 250 colleagues  were working around the clock to save the Jewish population from being sent to Nazi concentration camps; this figure later rose to approximately 400. Lars and Edith Ernster, Jacob Steiner, and many others were housed at the Swedish Embassy in Budapest on Üllői Street 2-4 and 32 other buildings throughout the city which Wallenberg had rented and declared as extraterritorially Swedish to try to safeguard the residents.

Italian Giorgio Perlasca did the same, sheltering Jews in the Spanish Embassy.

On the night of 8 January 1945, an Arrow Cross execution brigade forced all the inhabitants of the building on Vadasz Street to the banks of the Danube. At midnight, Karoly Szabo and 20 policemen with drawn bayonets broke into the Arrow Cross house and rescued everyone (see also front page of 1947 newspaper below). Among those saved were Lars Ernster, who fled to Sweden and became a member of the board of the Nobel Foundation from 1977 to 1988, and Jacob Steiner, who fled to Israel and became a professor at the Hebrew University of Jerusalem. Steiner's father had been shot dead by Arrow Cross militiamen 25 December 1944, and fell into the Danube. His father had been an officer in World War I and spent four years as a prisoner of war in Russia.

Dr. Erwin K. Koranyi, a psychiatrist in Ottawa, wrote about the night of 8 January 1945 in his Dreams and Tears: Chronicle of a Life (2006), "in our group, I saw Lajos Stoeckler" and "The police holding their guns at the Arrowcross cutthroats. One of the high-ranking police officers was Pal Szalai, with whom Raoul Wallenberg used to deal. Another police officer in his leather coat was Karoly Szabo."

Pal Szalai was honored as Righteous Among the Nations on 7 April 2009 for helping save these Hungarian Jews.

Karoly Szabo was honored as Righteous Among the Nations on 12 November 2012.

2014 defacement
In September 2014, the Israeli newspaper Ha'aretz reported that several bronze shoes were stolen from the Danube Holocaust memorial, citing the Budapest Beacon. Ha'aretz noted that "it was not immediately clear whether the theft in Budapest, not far from the Hungarian parliament building, was an anti-Semitic act or a meaningless prank. Police said they were not investigating the case because no crime has been reported, said Hungarian newspaper Nepszabadsag."

See also 
Carl Lutz
Raoul Wallenberg
Miklós Vig
The Holocaust
List of people who assisted Jews during the Holocaust

References

Bibliography

External links

 Rescue Story on the Danube Bank in Yad Vashem Database of Righteous 
 Gyula Pauer site including a map, photographs and a film
 Jewish Budapest site 
 Edith Ernster remembers
 Document about January 8, 1945. in Budapest Archives (Hungarian)
 Other documents about January 8, 1945. (English)
 Photographs of the shoes at Szoborlap.hu
 Jewish.hu - The shoes on the river

Culture in Budapest
History of Budapest
Hungarian war crimes
Holocaust commemoration
Jewish Hungarian history
Monuments and memorials in Hungary
Raoul Wallenberg
Buildings and structures in Budapest
Tourist attractions in Budapest
2005 establishments in Hungary